The Collective is a 2008 American independent horror film written, directed, and produced by Judson Pearce Morgan and Kelly Overton. The film was released to film festivals in 2008 and slated for theatrical release in 2009.

Plot
Tyler Clarke (Kelly Overton) receives a cryptic voice-mail from her sister Jessica (Wynn Everett) pleading for help but giving no explanation of the trouble she is in. Tyler makes several attempts to call her sister but to no avail. In a moment of desperation, she takes the red-eye to New York to find Jessica. Upon her arrival in the city, she realises that her sister is nowhere to be found and has seemingly disappeared without a trace. In order to find out what has happened, Tyler must delve into a world of darkness and lies, which ultimately leads her to the underbelly of a spiritually depraved community living in a deconsecrated cathedral calling themselves "The Collective". Tyler is both shocked and horrified to discover that her sister is now one of them. She is now forced to ask the ultimate question, is she ready to risk her own life to save her sister's?

Cast

Production

Reception
Justin Tanzer of Off Off Off gave a mixed review of the film, writing that the film "lacks believability and high stakes. It is short on thought. It takes place in isolation, lacking meaningful interaction between the characters and anybody outside conspiracy-land", but granting the "movie's most redeeming feature is that it's well crafted from a technical point of view. Director/cinematographer Morgan, who has been primarily an actor up to now, has done a fantastic job behind the camera. The light and colors are simply beautiful. It would be a pleasure to see more of his work".  In her review of the film, Robyn Hillman-Herrigan of Brooklyn Daily Eagle reported that the film was winner of the Audience Choice Award at the 2008 Brooklyn International Film Festival and that the husband-wife team of Kelly Overton and Judson Pearce wanted to make a "‘Bourne Identity’- type suspense thriller on a low budget."  When commenting about The Collective screening at the festival, Tom Boyd of Real Vail wrote of Kelly Overton, "[she] is just the kind of star Vail attracts: she’s young, up-and-coming, and about to debut in the leading role in her first feature film".

Awards and nominations
The Collective has been screening at multiple film festivals through 2008 and 2009, and has received recognition at many, including:
2008 Brooklyn International Film Festival, Audience Award
2008 HDFest, First runner-up Best HD Editing in a Feature, Honorable Mention Best Cinematography in a Feature
2008 Zero Film Festival, Purple Heart
2008 Trimedia Film festival, Audience Award, Best Feature Film
2009 Honolulu International Film Festival, Gold Kahuna Award

Soundtrack
The Collective featured the song "Parachutes and Lifeboats" by the band Rue Royale.

References

External links 
 
 

2008 films
American horror films
2008 horror films
2000s English-language films
2000s American films